Idris Goodwin is an American, rapper, essayist, and poet. In July 2022, Idris Goodwin became the third Artistic Director of Seattle Children's Theatre.

Early life

Idris Goodwin was born in Detroit, Michigan. He earned a Bachelor of Arts in Film, Video, and Screenwriting at Columbia College Chicago. Goodwin received his Master of Fine Arts in Creative Writing at the School of the Art Institute of Chicago. He did graduate work at the University of Iowa Playwrights Workshop.

Career
The first play Goodwin ever wrote was titled Braising in 2001, and was performed in the back of a coffee shop. Goodwin recalls that the play was "thrown together and done on a budget… and miraculously we got a great review."

Since then he has written and had several successful plays produced such as And in This Corner… Cassius Clay (2016), which received the 2017 Distinguished Play Award from The American Association of Theater and Education

And in This Corner... Cassius Clay (2016) was commissioned by Stage One Family Theater in Louisville, Kentucky, in partnership with the Muhammad Ali Center. During Metro Theater Company's follow up production, they initiated The Cassius Project, which included a website with details of Ali's life, juxtaposing it with major points of the civil rights movement.

How We Got On (2013), was developed at the Eugene O'Neill Playwriting Conference and premiered in the Actors Theater's 2012 Humana Festival and was also nominated for an ATCA Steinberg New Play Award.

Goodwin has earned awards from the Hip Hop Theater festival, The Illinois Arts Council, the National Endowment for the Arts, the Ford Foundation, the Mellon Foundation, and the Edgerton Foundation. In 2017, Goodwin won the Blue Ink Playwriting Award for HYPE MAN:a break beat play. The play takes place in wake of a controversial police shooting and it was selected as the winner in a pool of 543 submissions. HYPE MAN received its world premiere at Company One in 2018. It won the Elliot Norton Award for Best New Play that same year. Numerous theatres across the country produced Hype Man through 2018 and 2019 including, The Flea Theater and The Fountain Theatre.

Goodwin lectures at colleges, high schools/middle schools, and other venues all throughout the United States. He also credits playwright Lorraine Hansberry, playwright August Wilson, and Chuck D of Public Enemy as inspirations for his work.

Goodwin has been featured on Def Poetry Jam, and was part of the cast on the documentary film What's On Your Plate (2009), a narrative about two eleven-year-old African-American exploring their place in society. He also performed on PBS’s Sesame Street, and for National Public Radio.
He is also featured in the 2010 Youth Poetry documentary Louder Than a Bomb.

Write Bloody Books published "These are the Breaks" Goodwin's collection of essays and poems in 2011. The collection of essays was nominated for a Pushcart Prize in the same year. It was in this book, along with his 2010 album Break Beat Poems that Goodwin coined the term Break Beat Poetry.

In May 2020, Idris Goodwin became the Director of the Colorado Springs Fine Arts Center at Colorado College

Idris is a 2021 United States Artist Fellow.

Plays

Braising – 2001
How We Got On (the first break beat play) – 2012
Blackademics – 2012
Bars and Measures- 2014
The Raid – 2015
This is Modern Art (based on true events) – 2015 
And in This Corner...Cassius Clay −2016 
The Realness: a break beat play-2016
HYPE MAN: a break beat play – 2017
The Way the Mountain Moved – 2018
Frankenstein – 2018
Ghost (based upon the novel by Jason Reynolds) – 2019
The Boy Who Kissed the Sky – 2022

Albums

Break Beat Poems −2010
Break Beat Bars −2011
Rhyming While Black −2014

References

Living people
American male essayists
American male poets
American male rappers
American dramatists and playwrights
Colorado College faculty
Columbia College Chicago alumni
School of the Art Institute of Chicago alumni
Year of birth missing (living people)